Donguz test site (full name: , formerly known as Научно-испытательный полигон ПВО МО РФ, в/ч 33157,Научно-Испытательный Зенитно-Артиллерийский Полигон — НИЗАП) is a military proving ground in Orenburg Oblast, Russia. Site administration and main living quarters are in the settlement of Pervomaysky. The site occupies about 121,000 hectares of steppe, making it the largest in Orenburg Oblast.

Due to the specific utilization of this steppe area (Donguz Steppe), it is the last in Europe remaining virgin land with representative flora and fauna.

External links

References

Orenburg Oblast
Proving grounds
Military installations of Russia
Military installations of the Soviet Union